Pennsylvania's Attorney General election was held November 2, 2004. Necessary primary elections were held on April 27, 2004. Tom Corbett was elected attorney general, a position that he had held from 1995 to 1997 after being appointed by Governor Tom Ridge to fill a vacancy.  Corbett, who had been a U.S. Attorney, narrowly defeated Montgomery County District Attorney Bruce Castor in the Republican primary, then won by an even tighter margin in the general election. Corbett's Democratic opponent was Jim Eisenhower, the 2002 nominee who had once served as an Assistant U.S. Attorney and had been a close confidant of Governor Ed Rendell. Eisenhower won in a primary that featured three top-tier candidates: his opponents were David Barasch, a former U.S. Attorney, and John Morganelli, the Northampton County District Attorney who was narrowly defeated by Eisenhower in the previous Democratic primary for this position.

Republican primary
In the Republican primary, Bruce Castor was supported by Mike Fisher, Rob Gleason, Frank Bartle and Fred Anton.  Tom Corbett was supported by Chris Bravacos, Stan Rapp, Bob Asher, David Girard DiCarlo, and Jeff Piccola. Joe Peters was supported by Paul Evanko, Roger Madigan, Frank Rizzo, and Bill Scranton.

Results

Democratic primary

Republican primary

General election

References

Attorney General
2004
Pennsylvania